Commerce Township is an inactive township in Scott County, in the U.S. state of Missouri.

Commerce Township was erected in 1822, taking its name from the community of Commerce, Missouri.

References

Townships in Missouri
Townships in Scott County, Missouri